Akshukyr (also known as Aqshuqyr (Aqşūqyr, اقشۇقىر)) is a town in Tupkaragan District, Mangystau Region, southwest Kazakhstan. Administrative Centre of Tupkaragan District.

References

Mangystau Region
Cities and towns in Kazakhstan